Andrei Florescu (born 30 May 2002) is a Romanian professional footballer who plays as a left winger for Liga II side Dinamo București.

Club career

Dinamo București

He made his Liga I debut for Dinamo București against FC Voluntari on 19 July 2021. He was loaned at Metaloglobus București for two seasons.

Career statistics

Club

References

External links
 
 

2002 births
Living people
Footballers from Bucharest
Romanian footballers
Association football midfielders
FC Dinamo București players
Liga I players
Liga II players
FC Metaloglobus București players
Romania youth international footballers